Zionism in the Age of the Dictators is a 1983 work by the American free-lance journalist, outspoken pro-Palestinian activist and Trotskyist Lenni Brenner. The book makes the argument that Zionist leaders collaborated with fascism, particularly in Nazi Germany, in order to build up a Jewish presence in Palestine.

Zionism in the Age of the Dictators is one of two works by Brenner on the alleged collaboration between Zionism and Nazism. Brenner returns to this topic in his 2002 work 51 Documents: Zionist Collaboration with the Nazis.

Argument of the book
Like classic antisemites, early Zionists, he claims, considered antisemitism to be the fault of Jews themselves, as putative rootless "intruders"  trying to assimilate and exploiting socialist movements to do so. Only in Palestine, Zionists argued, could Jews become a healthy race.

Brenner notes that Theodor Herzl himself confided to his diary that he tried to win over Germany's Kaiser Wilhelm to Zionism by arguing that the movement would subtract Jews from revolutionary parties by relocating them abroad. Zionism's contempt for socialism led its leaders to repeatedly cooperate with conservative nationalist movements to suppresse this perceived threat.

Brenner charges that the World Zionist Organization's abandonment of the idea that Jews in the diaspora were worth helping played a consequential role in the fate that later befel the Jews. To this end he cites several documents, one of which is a memorandum of the Zionist Federation of Germany sent to the Nazi Party soon after Hitler became Chancellor. In it German Zionists undertook to ensure that Jews would thenceforth avoid "becoming the rootless critics of the national foundations of German essence," for
a rebirth of national life, such as is occurring in German life through adhesion to Christian and national values, must also take place in the Jewish national group.

Brenner states that, after the passage of the Nuremberg Laws in 1935, Zionism was the one Jewish organization permitted to exist in Germany, and its flag the only one allowed to fly next to the Nazi banner. He reads the Ha'avara Agreement negotiated between Zionists and the Nazis as a subversion of the Anti-Nazi boycott promoted by the diaspora Jewish mainstream.

Zionists, in Brenner's interpretation, were so intent on colonizing Palestine with Jews, that they prioritized emigration there over any other form of rescuing Jews.  To this end, Brenner cites a remark made by David Ben-Gurion in the wake of Kristallnacht when great Britain laid out a proposal to convey thousands of Jewish children at risk to the safety of its shores. Ben-Gurion commented
If I knew that it would be possible to save all the children in Germany by bringing them over to England, and only half of them by transporting them to Eretz Yisrael, then I would opt for the second alternative.

Likewise, in the United States in 1943 Brenner states that rabbi Stephen Wise opposed a congressional bill designed to create a rescue commission for Jews because it failed to mention Palestine.

Brenner concludes his book by a chapter on the Stern gang – which had broken away from the Irgun – and its efforts to forge an alliance with the Nazis against Great Britain, on the basis that the gang viewed itself as a totalitarian nationalist movement in the German mould. Suppressed as a terrorist group during the war, the reviewer notes, in the postwar era, one of its leaders, Yitzhak Shamir rose to become Prime Minister of Israel, and the former Irgun militant, Menachem Begin, on becoming Prime Minister, honoured the gang's founder, Avraham Stern by having a postage stamp with his portrait printed.

Positive reviews
Upon its initial publication the book received a positive review in The Times, with Edward Mortimer describing it as "crisp and carefully documented".

An anonymous Merip reviewer, himself a refugee from the Holocaust, called the book extremely important, and "singular" in outlining an argument that Zionism with its intention of ensuring the survival of Jews interacted symbiotically with antisemites and movements rooted in extreme hatred of Jews. Brenner drew on ample documentation whose contents were known, but existed only in obscure journals and books that were otherwise difficult to access. He was nonetheless critical of Brenner's "hectoring second-guessing of nearly every move made by the Jewish leadership during the fascist and Nazi era", on the grounds that not many options existed in that phase of Jewish history. There was, he concludes, no need for "sledge-hammer moralizing" for "(w)e don't need it. The evidence compiled in this book speaks quite eloquently for itself."

Writing for the Journal of Palestine Studies, Hilton Obenzinger prefaced his remarks by noting from personal experience the atmosphere of hostility that surrounded any attempt to address the Palestinian issue in public: rational debate quickly broke down into a "screaming bedlam". Reading the book, he opines, will shake the moral credibility of Zionist claims to be defenders of the Jews. For Obenzinger Brenner's meticulous documentation expressed an intention to disarm criticism of a thesis that would be considered controversial, and ward off the "barrage of abuse" its publication would inevitably excite.

Gilbert Achcar, surveying the literature on the period of interaction between Zionists and Germany, argues that both movements deeply disliked each other, each striving to use the other for their respective purposes, which crossed over in a common interest in removing Jews from Germany. While referring the reader to Brenner's work, which he appraises as a "vigorous indictment", he draws attention to Francis R. Nicosia's critique of Brenner's study.

Negative reviews
C. C. Aronsfeld, of the Institute of Jewish Affairs in a review published in the journal International Affairs, criticized the book concluding that "Brenner has produced a party political tract that unhinges the balance of history by ignoring too many difficulties, especially psychological. For once Stalinists will be pleased with the work of a Trotskyist."

In his review for The New Republic of Edwin Black's The Transfer Agreement, Eric Breindel accused Brenner of defaming Zionism, of misinterpreting the single Stern gang proposal, and also added that the Institute for Historical Review, which asserted that the Holocaust was a hoax, was promoting Brenner's work. Brenner duly replied but The New Republic refused to publish his letter. Alexander Cockburn, writing in defense of Brenner, stated that Breindel's insinuation that Brenner and the Institute for Historical Review were in sympathy flew in the face of the fact that Brenner acknowledged the slaughter of the Shoah and had publicly encouraged people to bust up meetings by that institute.

Bryan Cheyette reviewed it for the journal Patterns of Prejudice. He writes that the book was a "crude ...pseudo-scholarly" piece of left-wing revisionism, and classified it as an example of a trend towards "pathological anti-Zionism" that arose in the wake of the UN declaration (1975) equating racism and Zionism, which moreover Brenner indicts for failing to mobilize the working classes against antisemitism. Because Brenner does not discuss the Israeli-Palestinian conflict he is "fictionalizing Zionism". After listing and disagreeing with Brenner's estimations of several historical figures, Cheyette concludes by deploring in the strongest terms the fact that the book was distributed by a respectable British publisher.

Criticism of Brenner from the left
Socialist writer Gerry Ben-Noah wrote a critical review for the Trotskyite Workers' Liberty. Ben-Noah argues that Brenner "creates a fantasy world in which the Zionists did wish for and expect the Holocaust, and in which the most fanatical Jewish nationalists were in reality, ardent anti-semites". Highly critical of the argument that "Zionists saw anti-semites as nationalists like themselves with a common objective in the removal of Jews from Europe", Ben-Noah asks rhetorically, "Where does one begin to review work like this?"

Ken LIvingstone controversy

Brenner is on record since the 1980s as being highly critical of the exploitation of his research by neo-Nazi Holocaust deniers. On the occasion of a controversy that broke out when the former Mayor of London Ken Livingstone cited Brenner's book as the source for his view that Hitler suppored Zionism, both David Hirsh and the historian Thomas Weber lambasted Brenner's work, commenting that, in their view, it was a sourcebook for antizionists and anti-Semites, and lay outside the academic mainstream. Weber also asserted that Brenner's book was not taken seriously by mainstream scholarship, and that the Institute for Historical Review cited the book in their research. David Rosenberg, Jewish anti-Zionist activist in the Jewish Socialists' Group, supporter of Jews for Justice for Palestinians, and a Labour Party member. stated that Zionism in the Age of the Dictators is "badly written and with poor scholarship – a piece of tabloid journalism glued together with selective facts and lots of conjecture".

On being subsequently suspended from the Labour Party, Livingstone indicated that he intended to use Brenner's work when appealing his suspension.

Influence
The book served as inspiration for the controversial 1987 play Perdition, which was cancelled due to allegations of antisemitism.  The playwright, Jim Allen, referred to the book as a "goldmine source".  David Cesarini, commenting on Allen's admission that Brenner's work was a key inspiration for his play, asserted that,
Many of his "facts" and "quotations" had been pre-selected and edited by Brenner to fit the well-established anti-Zionist argument that Israel is a "racist" state governed by a fascist (Yitzhak Shamir), the origins of which can be explicated by reference to parallels between Nazi and Zionist ideology and instances of concrete collaboration.

Notes

Citations

Sources

1983 non-fiction books
Books critical of Zionism
History books about Zionism
Jewish anti-Zionism in the United States
Jewish collaboration with Nazi Germany